This is a list of films released by the British studio British and Dominions Film Corporation between 1928 and 1938. The company was dominated by the producer and director Herbert Wilcox. The company gained a contract to make quota films for release by the British subsidiary of Paramount Pictures and these are also included. All films were made at British and Dominions' Imperial Studios at Elstree unless stated otherwise.

1920s

1930s

See also
 List of Gainsborough Pictures films
 List of Ealing Studios films
 List of Stoll Pictures films
 List of British Lion films
 List of Two Cities Films
 List of British National films
 List of General Film Distributors films
 List of Paramount British films

Bibliography
 Low, Rachael. History of the British Film, 1918-1929. George Allen & Unwin, 1971.
Wood, Linda. British Films, 1927–1939. British Film Institute, 1986.

List
British and Dominions